Paul Rogat Loeb (born July 4, 1952) is an American social and political activist.

Loeb was born in 1952 in Berkeley, California. He attended Stanford University and subsequently attended New York's New School for Social Research and worked actively to end the Vietnam War. He also began his writing and speaking career during this time.

Loeb's writings have appeared in numerous newspapers and journals. His first book, Nuclear Culture, examined the daily life of atomic weapons workers at the Hanford Site in Tri-Cities, Washington. Hope In Hard Times portrayed ordinary Americans involved in grassroots peace activism. He has also written books examining student activism at universities, and his book Soul of a Citizen aimed to inspire citizen activists. His book The Impossible Will Take a Little While, an anthology of the achievements of activists in history who faced enormous obstacles, was named the #4 political book of 2004 by the History Channel and the American Book Association and won the Nautilus Book Award for best social change book of the year. In 2010 St Martin's Press released a wholly updated edition of Soul of a Citizen, which now has 170,000 copies in print between the two editions

Loeb's work offers an often alternative look at current social issues, from poverty and taxation and budget priorities to criminal justice, environmentalism, and citizen activism. His writing has received much attention and been cited in Congressional debates. He has been interviewed hundreds of times for radio, TV and print media. He's also lectured at numerous college campuses and national conferences. He founded the Campus Election Engagement Project, a national nonpartisan effort to engage students in voting. 

Loeb is a Huffington Post blogger and lives in Seattle.

Bibliography
Nuclear Culture (New Society Publishers, 1986)
Hope in Hard Times: America's Peace Movement and the Reagan Era (Lexington Books, 1986)
Generation at the Crossroads: Apathy and Action on the American Campus (Rutgers University Press, 1994)
Soul of a Citizen:  Living With Conviction in a Cynical Time (St. Martin's Press, 1999)
The Impossible Will Take a Little While: A Citizen's Guide to Hope in a Time of Fear (Basic Books, 2004)

References

External links
Paul Rogat Loeb's Official Website

 with Paul Loeb by Stephen McKiernan, Binghamton University Libraries Center for the Study of the 1960s, January 30, 2010

American political writers
Writers about activism and social change
American bloggers
HuffPost writers and columnists
American male non-fiction writers
Nautilus Book Award winners
American anti-war activists
American anti–Vietnam War activists
American democracy activists
American social activists
Sustainability advocates
Activists from the San Francisco Bay Area
Writers from Seattle
The New School alumni
Stanford University alumni
1952 births
Living people